is a television station affiliated with the TX Network in Osaka, Japan.  The mascot character is "Takoru-kun" (たこるくん).

History
Television Osaka, Inc. was founded in 1981 as part of the reorganization of Tokyo Channel 12 Ltd (now TV Tokyo). On March 1 the following year, TV Osaka started broadcasting as the first affiliate of the "Mega TON Network" (メガTONネットワーク, now TX Network) outside of Tokyo.

On December 1, 2003, TV Osaka adopted a new logo to reflect the digital era, when they commenced digital telecasts. Analog telecasts were terminated on July 24, 2011.

Anime produced
The New Adventures of Maya the Honeybee
Taotao Ehonkan
Fushigi no Kuni no Alice
Mahou no Stage Fancy Lala
Gasaraki
Soreyuke! Uchuu Senkan Yamamoto Yohko
Guru Guru Town Hanamaru-kun
Cosmic Baton Girl Comet-san
Geisters
Galaxy Angel (Z/A/AA)
Pita-Ten
Di Gi Charat Nyo
The Marshmallow Times
Onegai My Melody
Jewelpet
Romance of the Three Kingdoms
Oshiete Mahou no Pendulum ~Rilu Rilu Fairilu~
Tomica Bond Combination Earth Granner
Mazica Party
Cap Revolution Bottleman DX (current)
PuniRunes (current)

Transmitters

Offices
The headquarters – 1-2-18, Otemae, Chūō-ku, Osaka, Osaka Prefecture, Japan
Kobe Branch Office – Nikkei Kobe Kaikan, 7-1-14, Shimoyamate-dori, Chūō-ku, Kobe, Hyōgo Prefecture
Tokyo Branch Office – Ginza Towa Building, 3-10-7, Ginza, Chūō, Tokyo
Nagoya Branch Office – Nikkei Nagoya Office, 4-16-33, Sakae, Naka-ku, Nagoya, Aichi Prefecture

See also

 Television in Japan

External links
 the official website of TV Osaka
 Corpolate Profile

Companies based in Osaka Prefecture
Television channels and stations established in 1981
TX Network
Mass media in Osaka